Hibla Gerzmava (born 6 January 1970) is an Abkhazian-Russian operatic soprano who currently resides in Moscow.

Education and career

Gerzmava since 1995 she has been a soloist of the Stanislavski and Nemirovich-Danchenko Theatre.

In 2008 Gerzmava made her Covent Garden debut as Tatyana in Eugene Onegin. Her voice being described as clear and focused, yet also full of colour and with a reservoir of power that enables her to ride the biggest fortes like a surfer on a wave. In the winter of 2009, Gerzmava performed for the first time the role of Lucia in the Stanislavski and Nemirovich-Danchenko Theatre.

In September–October 2010, Gerzmava made her Metropolitan Opera debut in the parts of Stella and Antonia in Jacques Offenbach's The Tales of Hoffmann, and in November–December 2011 she went back there to sing Mimi in Franco Zeffirelli's production of La bohème. Gerzmava took part in the closing ceremony of the 22nd Winter Olympic Games that took place at the Fisht Olympic Stadium in Sochi.

Festival

The festival was born in 2001. On a stage of Pitsunda Cathedral and the Abkhazian State Philharmonic acted Elena Obraztsova, Vladimir Spivakov, Ildar Abdrazakov, pianist Denis Matsuev, Deborah Brown, Daniel Kramer's trio, Yakov Okun, Felix Korobov, the Kazan state orchestra "La Primavera" and other known Russian collectives. The eighth festival of classical music has passed In September, 2009. In year 2014 for the first time the Festival was running in Moscow.

Repertoire

Ludmila in Ruslan and Ludmila by Mikhail Glinka
The Swan in The Tale of Tsar Saltan by Nikolai Rimsky-Korsakov
Queen of Shemakha in The Golden Cockerel by Nikolai Rimsky-Korsakov
Louise in Betrothal in a Monastery by Sergei Prokofiev
Tatyana in Eugene Onegin by Pyotr Ilyich Tchaikovsky
Nymph in Daphne by Marco da Gagliano
Rosina in Il Barbiere di Siviglia by Gioachino Rossini
Adina in L'elisir d'amore by Gaetano Donizetti
Violetta in La traviata by Giuseppe Verdi
Musetta and Mimi in La bohème by Giacomo Puccini
Adele in Die Fledermaus by Johann Strauss II
Vitelia in La clemenza di Tito by Wolfgang Amadeus Mozart
Lucia in Lucia di Lammermoor by Gaetano Donizetti
Donna Anna, Zerlina in Don Giovanni by Wolfgang Amadeus Mozart
Parasha in Mavra by Igor Stravinsky
Liu in Turandot by Giacomo Puccini
Amelia Grimaldi in Simon Boccanegra by Giuseppe Verdi
Olympia, Antonia, Giulietta in The Tales of Hoffmann by Jacques Offenbach
Médée in Médée by Luigi Cherubini

Recognitions and awards
The International Rimsky-Korsakov Competition. St.-Petersburg (Russia). 2nd Prize Winner.

2001
The Golden Orpheus Opera Festival. Moscow (Russia). The Best Singer Award.

2006
Gerzmava was made an Merited Artist of the Russian Federation by Russian president Vladimir Putin.

2010
The Golden Mask. Moscow (Russia). The Best Female Role.

2012
People's Artist of Russia

References

External links
 Official website
 Official Facebook Page
 Hibla on Itunes
 Interview with Gramophone

1970 births
Living people
People from Pitsunda
Russian people of Abkhazian descent
Russian operatic sopranos
Moscow Conservatory alumni
20th-century Russian women opera singers
21st-century Russian women opera singers
Abkhazian musicians
Prize-winners of the International Tchaikovsky Competition
Honored Artists of the Russian Federation
People's Artists of Russia
Recipients of the Golden Mask